Pangio anguillaris is a species of loach found in still and slow-moving freshwater in Indochina (Mekong and Chao Phraya basins), Malay Peninsula, Sumatra, and Borneo.

This is a slender fish (the specific name means "eel-like") measuring up to 12 cm standard length. It is generally brown, sometimes with tiny spots, with a faint dark lateral stripe down the body. It is a rather slow-moving species, often burying itself in the mud or sand. It is often found in temporary waters such as seasonally flooded fields. It is not caught in large numbers although it is considered a delicacy in parts of Thailand and small numbers end up in the aquarium trade.

References 

Pangio
Fish described in 1902
Fish of the Mekong Basin
Fish of Cambodia
Freshwater fish of Indonesia
Freshwater fish of Malaysia
Fish of Laos
Fish of Thailand
Fish of Vietnam